The Prince of Egypt: Inspirational was one of three albums produced alongside the release of DreamWorks's 1998 film, The Prince of Egypt. This album, including songs written and inspired by the film, featured contemporary Christian music and gospel artists, and was released on November 17, 1998.

Track listing
 "Destiny", performed by Take 6 – 4:09
 "The River", produced by Scott "Shavoni" Parker, performed by Cece Winans – 3:54
 "I Will Get There", performed by Boyz II Men – 4:21
 "Most High Interlude (Part 1)", produced by Scott “Shavoni” Parker, performed by Tyrone Tribbett & Greater Anointing – 1:29
 "As Long As You're With Me", produced by Scott "Shavoni" Parker, performed by Trin-I-Tee 5:7 – 3:48
 "Power", performed by Fred Hammond & Radical For Christ – 5:18
 "Stay With Me", produced by Scott "Shavoni" Parker, performed by Bebe Winans – 4:59
 "God Will Take Care Of Me", performed by Carman – 3:37
 "Most High Interlude (Part 2)", performed by Tyrone Tribbett And Greater Anointing – 1:54
 "I Am", performed by Donnie McClurkin – 5:25
 "Didn't I", produced by Scott "Shavoni" Parker, performed by Christian – 3:25
 "Let Go, Let God", produced by Scott "Shavoni" Parker, performed by Tye Tribbett (under full name Tyrone Tribbett And Greater Anointing) and Mary Mary – 3:45
 "Let My People Go", performed by Kirk Franklin – 5:30
 "Father", produced by Scott "Shavoni" Parker, performed by Brian McKnight – 4:11
 "Everything In Between", performed by Jars of Clay – 3:13
 "My Deliverer", performed by DC Talk – 5:14
 "Most High Interlude (Part 3)", performed by Tyrone Tribbett And Greater Anointing – 1:30
 "Moses The Deliverer", performed by Shirley Caesar – 6:26

Sales

References

1990s film soundtrack albums
DreamWorks Records soundtracks
1998 soundtrack albums
The Prince of Egypt